Shanghai Aerospace Enthusiasts Center is an aviation history museum in Shanghai, China. It is located at 7900 Humin Road in Shanghai. It has models of aircraft and spacecraft.

Exhibits 
There are missiles and a DC-9 Airliner outside the building. The center has a 3d video room and flight simulators. One of the aircraft on display is a former JAL DC-8 airliner (Registration: JA8048) that was involved in an accident at Shanghai in 1982.

References

Tourist attractions in Shanghai
Museums in Shanghai
Aerospace museums in China